Clonmellon (but also attested to originally have been Cluain Miolain) is a small village officially in County Westmeath although on the border with County Meath, Ireland. It is situated on the N52 road between Kells in County Meath and Delvin in County Westmeath.

Buildings of note
Ballinlough Castle, a 17th-century country house is located nearby. The 18th-century Killua Castle is also located close to Clonmellon.

See also
 List of towns and villages in Ireland
 Market Houses in Ireland

References

External links
 Killua Castle before renovation

Towns and villages in County Westmeath